Nepal participated at the 2018 Summer Youth Olympics in Buenos Aires, Argentina from 6 October to 18 October 2018.

Athletics

Badminton

Nepal was given a quota to compete by the tripartite committee.

Singles

Team

Judo

Individual

Team

Weightlifting

Nepal was given a quota by the tripartite committee to compete in weightlifting.

 Boys' events - 1 quota

References

2018 in Nepalese sport
Nations at the 2018 Summer Youth Olympics
Nepal at the Youth Olympics